Heinz Stuy (born 6 February 1945, Wanne-Eickel) is a former Dutch football goalkeeper who played for AFC Ajax and was part of their European Cup victories in 1971, 1972 and 1973.

Career
Stuy was born in north-western Germany to a Dutch father and German mother during the final months of World War II in 1945. His family remained there until relocating to Ijmuiden when he was seven years old. He quickly learned Dutch and was able to successfully integrate into the community at a time of great anti-German hostility after the war.

Nicknamed Heinz Kroket ('Heinz Croquette') because he would sometimes drop a high ball as if it were a hot croquette, Stuy won the Intercontinental Cup, three European Cups, two European Super Cups, four league titles and three Dutch Cups with Ajax in the club's "golden era". Despite this success at club level he never appeared for the Netherlands national football team, sharing with Bernd Dürnberger (a Bayern Munich player of the 1970s and 1980s) a distinction of having won the most major club titles without having ever played for his country.

Stuy set a record for most minutes played by a goalkeeper without conceding in the European Cup final between 1971 and 1973 (270 minutes in 2–0 victories over Panathinaikos and Inter Milan, and a 1–0 win over Juventus); however it was quickly beaten by a small margin – and never surpassed since then – by Bayern Munich's Sepp Maier, who accumulated 276 consecutive unbeaten minutes between 1974 and 1976 (1–1, 4–0, 2–0, 1–0).

Honors
Ajax
Eredivisie: 1971–72, 1972–73
KNVB Cup: 1969–70, 1970–71, 1971–72
European Cup: 1970–71, 1971–72, 1972–73
European Super Cup: 1972
Intercontinental Cup: 1972

References

1945 births
Living people
Dutch footballers
Eredivisie players
SC Telstar players
AFC Ajax players
FC Amsterdam players
Association football goalkeepers
People from Herne, North Rhine-Westphalia
Sportspeople from Arnsberg (region)
Footballers from North Rhine-Westphalia
UEFA Champions League winning players
German people of Dutch descent
German emigrants to the Netherlands
People from Velsen
Footballers from North Holland